is a railway station in the city of Nishio, Aichi, Japan, operated by Meitetsu.

Lines

Station layout
The station has two opposed side platforms connected by a level crossing. The station has automated ticket machines, Manaca automated turnstiles and is unattended.

Platforms

Adjacent stations

Station history
Yonezu Station was opened on May 1, 1926, as a station on the privately held Hekikai Electric Railway. Hekikai Electric Railway merged with the Meitetsu Group on May 1, 1944. The station has been unattended since February 1985.

Passenger statistics
In fiscal 2017, the station was used by an average of 942 passengers daily (boarding passengers only).

Surrounding area
Yonezu Elementary School

See also
 List of Railway Stations in Japan

References

External links

 Official web page 

Railway stations in Japan opened in 1926
Railway stations in Aichi Prefecture
Stations of Nagoya Railroad
Nishio, Aichi